Doslidnytske is an urban-type settlement in Bila Tserkva Raion (district) of Kyiv Oblast (region) in northern Ukraine. It belongs to Hrebinky settlement hromada, one of the hromadas of Ukraine.  Its population was 2,167 as of the 2001 Ukrainian Census. Current population: .

Until 18 July 2020, Doslidnytske belonged to Vasylkiv Raion. The raion was abolished that day as part of the administrative reform of Ukraine, which reduced the number of raions of Kyiv Oblast to seven. The area of Vasylkiv Raion was split between Bila Tserkva, Fastiv, and Obukhiv Raions, with Doslidnytske being transferred to Bila Tserkva Raion.

Gallery

References

Urban-type settlements in Bila Tserkva Raion
Populated places established in 1984